Sondern is a village in Olpe district, in North Rhine-Westphalia, Germany. As of 2011 it had a population of 484 people. It contains a leisure complex and campsite on the shores of a lake.

Notable people
Ernst Plassman (1823-1877) -sculptor

References

Villages in North Rhine-Westphalia
Olpe (district)